Nicky Evans (born 1979) is an English actor.

Nicky Evans may also refer to:
Nicky Evans (footballer) (born 1958), English footballer
Niki Evans, contestant on series 4 of the British The X Factor
Nikki Evans or Nicola Evans (born 1990), Irish field hockey player

See also
Nick Evans (disambiguation)